Union Area School District is a diminutive, suburban public school district located in Lawrence County, Pennsylvania. The District serves Union Township, Lawrence County, Pennsylvania as well the southeastern portion of Mahoning Township and the independent district of Edinburg which encompasses portions of several neighbouring townships. According to 2000 federal census data, Union Area School District served a resident population of 5,103. In 2010, the population was 5,563 people. In 2009, the district residents’ per capita income was $16,148, while the median family income was $41,086. In the Commonwealth, the median family income was $49,501 and the United States median family income was $49,445, in 2010.

Union Area School District operates one elementary school and a combined middle/high school ranging from fifth grade to twelfth grade.

Extracurriculars
Union Area School District offers a variety of clubs, activities and an extensive sports program.

Sports
The District funds:

Boys
Baseball - A
Basketball - A
Cross Country - A
Football - A
Golf - AA
Track and Field - AA

Girls
Basketball - A
Cross Country - A
Softball - A
Track and Field - AA
Volleyball - A

Junior High School Sports

Boys
Baseball
Basketball
Cross Country
Football
Golf
Track and Field

Girls
Basketball
Cross Country
Softball 
Track and Field
Volleyball

According to PIAA directory July 2012

References

School districts in Lawrence County, Pennsylvania